Lille Olympique Sporting Club, commonly referred to as LOSC, LOSC Lille or simply Lille, is a French professional football club based in Lille, Hauts-de-France that competes in Ligue 1, the top division of French football. Lille has played its home matches since 2012 at the Stade Pierre-Mauroy. The 50,186-capacity retractable roof venue is the fourth-largest football stadium in France.

Lille was founded as a result of a merger between Olympique Lillois and SC Fives in 1944. Both clubs were founding members of the French Division 1 and Olympique Lillois was the league's inaugural champions. In domestic football, the club has won four league titles, six Coupes de France and one Trophée des Champions since its foundation. In European football, Lille has participated in the UEFA Champions League eight times, reaching the knockout phase twice, competed in the UEFA Europa League on eight occasions and won the UEFA Intertoto Cup in 2004 after finishing as runners-up in 2002.

The club's most successful period was the decade from 1946 to 1956, in the post-war period, when the team led by managers George Berry and André Cheuva won seven major trophies, including a League/Cup double in 1946, and was known as La Machine de Guerre (French for "The War Machine"). Having won another double in 2011, its fourth league title in 2021 as well as its first French super cup, Lille is the fourth best French club in the 21st century.

Nicknamed Les Dogues (French for "The Mastiffs"), the club has a long-standing rivalry with nearby side Lens, with whom they contest the Derby du Nord. Lille leads in the head-to-head record between the two rivals and in terms of total trophies won. Currently owned by Luxembourg-based investment fund Merlyn Partners SCSp, it's the fifth-most followed French sports club on social media.

History

First decade of glory : The War Machine (1944–1955)

Before the Second World War, the city of Lille had two clubs at the top level; Olympique Lillois and SC Fives. Olympique Lillois were crowned domestic champions in 1932–33, the very firsts in the history of the championship that was created in 1932, and were runners-up in 1935–36. They also earned a USFSA Football Championship title in 1914, the French football top division before the creation of the French Division 1, and went to the Coupe de France final in 1939. Their neighbours, SC Fives, ranked second in 1933–34. They also went to the Coupe de France final, being defeated by Girondins AS Port in 1941.

Weakened by the war, the two clubs decided to merge in the autumn of 1944, on 23 September, giving birth to Stade Lillois, renamed Lille Olympique Sporting Club a few weeks later. On 25 November 1944, the club is officially registered under its new name.

For its very first season, the newborn club reached the 1945 Coupe de France final, with a squad composed of the best players of both merging teams, who are mostly natives of the Nord department. Next season, Lille won the double, beating Red Star in the 1946 Coupe de France Final and finishing at the first place of French Division 1 ahead of Saint-Étienne and Roubaix-Tourcoing. In 1947, Lille finished in the fourth place but came back to the Coupe de France final and retained the trophy, defeating Strasbourg. The club won the cup again in 1948 beating main rivals Lens, its third in a row, and were runners-up of the league the same year, behind Marseille that became the champions after a strong 1947–48 season finishing.

They were also runners-up in 1948–49, 1949–50 and 1950–51. On 24 June 1951, an exhausted Lille reached the Latin Cup final and lost against Gre-No-Li's AC Milan after having played 250 minutes in the span of two days.

On 31 May 1953, they got back to winning and earned their fourth Coupe de France trophy in a 2–1 final win against FC Nancy, before 60,000 spectators. The club then won its second domestic title in 1953–54, having only conceded 22 goals within 34 games. After this season, Lille is praised for its defensive proficiency and acquired a reputation as a rock-solid defense. A year later, Les Dogues earned their fifth Coupe de France in a 5-2 win against Bordeaux in the final.

This period of glory and hegemony, occurring after the war and the German occupation of France, has led to one of the club's nicknames: La Machine de Guerre (French for "The War Machine"). Within its first decade of existence, the club gathered the vast majority of its major trophies, winning two league titles and reaching the second place for four consecutive seasons. Lille, known as the best French club in the post-war period, accumulated five Coupe de France wins in seven finals, including five successive finals and winning the trophy three times in a row, one of the best performances in the history of the tournament.

Decline, reconstruction and reorganization (1956–2000)

Lille were relegated for the first time in 1956. The club became a mid-table side and in the late 1960s, after a long period of anonymity, and weighed down by a lack of facilities and resources, Lille abandoned its professional status. It was feared that the club might disappear. However, some young leaders, such as Max Pommerolle, came and gave new impetus to the club. Nevertheless, the results remained erratic and the only titles that ignited the fans' passions were won in the Second Division.

In July 1980, Lille was the first French club to opt for the status of a mixed economy company, of which the city of Lille became the majority shareholder. Presidents Jacques Amyot, Roger Deschodt and Jacques Dewailly all struggled to compete with the top teams in the country. Amyot's resignation in 1990 led to three more difficult years for the club which compromised its very existence. It took Bernard Lecomte's arrival in 1993 to set the club finances on the road to recovery. After a final relegation in 1997, the team trained by Bosnian coach Vahid Halilhodžić was soon promoted back to the elite, in the same year the French Football League was privatised. Club was purchased in 1999 by Luc Dayan and Francis Graille for 1 symbolic franc.

Back to the top and new double (2000–2016)

In just its first season back in the top flight 2000–01 French Division 1, Lille qualified for Europe for the first time in the club's history, booking its place in the 2001–02 Champions League. On the back of the club's new status, Lille entered into a decisive new era under the guidance of chairman and chief executive officer Michel Seydoux and coach Claude Puel. The club left the historical Stade Grimonprez-Jooris to join the Stadium Lille Métropole and became a regular on the European scene. Amongst its most emphatic results was the 1–0 victory over Manchester United at the Stade de France in 2005, the 2–0 triumph over Milan in San Siro in 2006 and the 1–0 home win over Liverpool in 2010.

In the 2010s, Lille knew a steady development on and off the pitch, and has established itself as one of the most important clubs in French Ligue 1. First, the inauguration of the vast and modern Domaine de Luchin training complex in 2007 brings the club to a new era, the center being one of the largest in France. Roughly at the same time, the construction of the 50,000-capacity Grand Stade Lille Métropole (renamed later Stade Pierre-Mauroy), which opened in 2012, began on 29 March 2010 and will give the club the fourth-largest football stadium in France. Successive strong results and a sporting progression under head coach Rudi Garcia took the club back to the top of the French league. Fifty-six years after the club's last trophy, 2010–11 first team, led by home-grown players Yohan Cabaye, Mathieu Debuchy and Eden Hazard, won the club's second double after finishing at the 2010–11 Ligue 1 top spot and defeating Paris Saint-Germain in the 2011 Coupe de France final.

In the 2011–12 and 2012–13 Ligue 1 seasons, Lille confirmed its place belong top French football teams, finishing successively at the second and sixth places and qualifying for the 2012–13 Champions League. In 2013, Garcia left to join Roma, while former Montpellier coach René Girard was appointed as new manager. Under Girard, Lille finished at the third place in 2013–14, behind Zlatan Ibrahimović's Paris Saint-Germain and James Rodríguez's Monaco. After two years in charge of the club and a deceiving eight seed at the end of the 2014–15 Ligue 1 season, Girard left the club by mutual consent.

In May 2015, the Ivory Coast national team head coach Hervé Renard was appointed as the new manager.  On 11 November 2015, Renard was terminated as manager and was replaced by Frederic Antonetti. On 23 November 2016, a year after being appointed, Lille terminated Antonetti's contract with the club lying second last in the table.

Campos and Galtier era: sustained success (2017–2021)
In early 2017, Lille appointed Luis Campos as sporting director and head of recruitment. A short time afterwards, the club announced the arrival of Argentine famous manager Marcelo Bielsa. In November 2017, Bielsa was suspended by Lille following an unauthorized trip to Chile with the club lying second from bottom on the table again and only managing 3 wins from the first 14 games of the season. On 23 December 2017, Bielsa was terminated by Lille and replaced with former Saint-Etienne manager Christophe Galtier. In a difficult 2017–18 season, Lille managed to avoid relegation to Ligue 2 by defeating Toulouse 3–2 in the second last game of the campaign.

Lille's following season is completely different. After the arrivals of veterans José Fonte and Loïc Rémy, Turkish right-back Zeki Çelik and forwards Jonathan Bamba, Jonathan Ikoné and Rafael Leão, the team proceeded to reel off a string of victories, losing only five games in the first part of the 2018–19 Ligue 1 season. On 14 April 2019, before a record attendance of 49,712 spectators, they defeated Paris Saint-Germain in a historic and storming 5–1 home win with goals from Nicolas Pépé, Jonathan Bamba, Gabriel and team captain José Fonte. At the end of the season, Lille secured the second place to qualify for the 2019–20 UEFA Champions League group stage; they returned to the competition after a seven-year absence. On 1 August 2019, club's season-top scorer Nicolas Pépé is sold to Premier League side Arsenal in a club-record fee of €80 million (£72 million). Lille announced the recruitment of Victor Osimhen and Tiago Djaló on the same day, after the signings of Timothy Weah, Reinildo Mandava and Benjamin André a few weeks earlier. The club then announced the arrivals of Yusuf Yazıcı and Renato Sanches to strengthen the midfield. In early March 2020, the Northmen were in 4th place with 49 points after 28 rounds. However, the Ligue 1 season ended abruptly as the LFP first suspended domestic leagues indefinitely following the outbreak of COVID-19 in France on 13 March, and then definitely cancelled French football competitions a month and a half later.

In the 2020 summer transfer window, Lille chose to sign young talents Sven Botman and Jonathan David as well as veteran Burak Yılmaz. At the end of the 2020–21 season first half, Lille had only lost two games and was well installed in the top league rankings, having defeated Derby du Nord rivals Lens in a 4–0 home win on 18 October 2020. The Mastiffs started the second part of the season with a six-game winning streak and lost only once until the end. On 3 April 2021, Lille won at Paris with a Jonathan David goal and took over sole possession of first place in the league. Three weeks later, Lille came back from two goals down to beat Lyon at Groupama Stadium as Burak Yılmaz scored twice including a 27-yard free kick in a breathtaking 3–2 away win. Lille then defeated local rivals once again, scoring three goals at Lens and prevailing in the season with an aggregate score of 7–0. On 23 May, Lille sealed the Ligue 1 title with a 2-1 victory at Angers after a dramatic Ligue 1 final round and won its fourth Ligue 1 title under the guidance of manager Christophe Galtier. At the end of the season, goalkeeper Mike Maignan finished the season with 21 clean sheets, one short of the league season all-time record. Competing also in the 2020–21 UEFA Europa League, they defeated AC Milan at San Siro, on 5 November 2020, in a big 3–0 away win with a hat-trick from Yusuf Yazıcı, but lost to Ajax in round of 32.

New cycle and Fonseca's arrival (2021–present)
In the 2021–22 season, Lille won its very first Trophée des Champions, defeating Paris Saint-Germain with a Xeka goal at Bloomfield Stadium in Tel Aviv, Israel on 1 August 2021. The Northmen then reached UEFA Champions League round of 16 and are defeated by Chelsea, after qualifying from the group stage against Salzburg, Sevilla and Wolfsburg. According to an analysis  report published at the end of the Ligue 1 season, Lille is the fourth best French club in Ligue 1, in the 21st century, behind Paris Saint-Germain, Lyon and Marseille.

On 29 June 2022, the club appointed Paulo Fonseca as new head coach of the first-team. The 2022–23 season started very well for the Northmen as they defeated Auxerre, on 7 August, in a 4–1 home win. On 9 October, they defeated close rivals Lens in a 1–0 home win. Being one of the best offensive teams in the league, Fonseca's Lille is praised for its stylish, slick passing game and its attacking system. Since the beginning of the season, Lille have played in an open, offensive 4–2–3–1 formation with Benjamin André, André Gomes or Angel Gomes playing as central midfielders behind playmaker Rémy Cabella and lone striker Jonathan David. Following 4–3 home win over Monaco on 23 October, only Lyon and Paris Saint-Germain have had more possession in France in the 2022–23 Ligue 1 season.

Identity and colours

Crest and nicknames

Lille's crest has changed many times. The very first crest of the newborn club was simply the escutcheon of the city of Lille dating from 1235 that shows an argent-on-gules fleur-de-lys. The fleur-de-lys refers to the name and the insularity of the city. "Lille", or "Lile" and "Lysle" depending on the past forms, is phonetically close to "Lisle", an old spelling of "Lys". The lys also makes reference to the water flag, which were rife through the marshes surrounding the city. The colours of the heraldry, argent (white) and gules (red), embody wisdom and wealth for the first one, and passion and faithfulness for the second.

White and red were the colours of Olympique Lillois while blue, traditional colour of the team shorts, refers to SC Fives and is also present in the first-ever club crest from 1946. Red remains the main colour used by the club in its imagery, on its website or its social media.

The club adopted the colours of his founding and merging parents, and the fleur-de-lys symbol that can be seen in the first badges. In 1981, the mastiff appeared for the first time in the club crest and has never left it. The nickname, Les Dogues (French for "The Mastiffs"), evokes and emphasizes the team's aggressiveness and dedication, and was first used in the 1920s for Olympique Lillois players. Other nicknames or designations are frequently used, like Les Nordistes (French for "The Northmen") or Les Lillois, the demonym corresponding to Lille.

In 1989, a new crest was unveiled which combines the fleur-de-lys and a mastiff that seems jumping out of the flower. The acronym "LOSC" is supplemented by the term "Lille Métropole" to enhance the Métropole Européenne de Lille size and importance in Western Europe. The club officials at that time wanted to entrench the club in its region, not only in the city but in a 1,000,000-inhabitants area where the club moved some facilities. This badge was marginally revised in 1997 but was replaced in 2002 with a more stylish one where the dog and the acronym are prominent. In 2012, the fleur-de-lys once again became a central element in the logo. The badge shape recalls the previous heraldry, and only the city and club name appear at the top of the logo like a crown.

The latest crest, which was unveiled in 2018, uses every club symbol (the club initials, the mastiff, the fleur-de-lys and the three colours) inside a regular pentagon shape, form of the Citadel of Lille's heart.

Notes

Kits and sponsors

Born from the union of two teams, Lille OSC embraced different shirts elements and symbols of both founding clubs. The first club's home kit was white and blue. The white jersey, with a large red "V" or chevron form around the neck and red sleeve ends, is inspired by the Olympique Lillois home jersey while the "V" shape comes from SC Fives kits as well as the blue shorts and socks. White was the jersey primary color with little shades of red. The red chevron was part of each jersey until 1964 when it disappeared to give place to an immaculate white jersey that only kept red collar and sleeve ends. This jersey version, white with only few red shades around collar and sleeves, remains substantially the same for decades.

In the 1990s, the different kit manufacturers successively added different red shapes around shoulders like a red check pattern, a large Reebok logo that lines the top of the shirt or a plain red pattern enabling the presence of a white chevron with red borders. The 1992-93 season marked the quick return of the red chevron. 1999 marked an significant moment in LOSC kits history. At the beginning of this season, the club chose to switch the principal colour of the kits. Home jerseys are now dominated by red, while away ones are white overall. The club exceptionally returns to a white home kit for the 2016–17 Ligue 1 season in order to celebrate the league and cup double 70-year anniversary.

Third kits are traditionally used for European games. Being initially blue in the early 2000s, third kits then used and incorporated flag of Flanders colours: black and yellow. Since the beginning of the twenty-first century, the club released more than a dozen black or yellow third kits.

Lille have known many sporting goods manufacturers in its history. From its creation until the 1970s, Lille didn't have a proper kit supplier. The first club's kit manufacturer was Le Coq Sportif which made Lille's first branded jerseys until 1975. In the 1980s, the club's supplier was Puma, one of the famous Lille's kit maker. Puma's sponsorship lasted for nine years, and the German brand shirts remain engraved in people's memories. After this period, many suppliers have come and gone including Lotto and Adidas for brief contracts. Reebok received the contract in 1996, stayed three seasons, before Nike started a first spell in 1999. Decathlon's football brand Kipsta, which is based in Lille region, Airness and Canterbury, the rugby-specialized company, followed. In 2013, Umbro took over until Nike started a second spell in 2013 that lasted three years.

On 22 June 2016, Lille announced a five-year partnership with New Balance, becoming one of the biggest football teams that have signed with the Boston-based sportswear manufacturer.  Partnership is renewed in 2021 on a new five-season contract until June 2026.

The first main sponsors of the club were Jean Caby butchery that appeared two seasons in the front of the jersey, and Lille-made Pel d'Or lemonade, produced by the very famous Pelforth brewery. One of the most iconic Lille sponsors is French nappy and baby products manufacturer Peaudouce that lasted more than ten years. Production factories were located in Linselles, in the Lille region and the nine red letters are now part of the identity of the club. However, Peaudouce was acquired by Sweden consumer products company SCA which decided to end the sponsorship. Foodservice company Eurest, banks Crédit Agricole and ING Direct are famous main sponsors too, that lasted at least two seasons.

Subsequently, the famous "P" of French casino and resort company Partouche appeared on Lille's jersey in 2003 for the first time. Based in the north of France, Partouche is Lille's most loyal sponsor: the brand logo was on the club's shirt during fourteen seasons. The most recent main sponsors are French consumer electronics retailer Boulanger and British online car retailer Cazoo. On 31 August 2022, Russian gambling company 1xBet signed a partnership deal to become their official regional partner in Middle East, North, and South Africa.

Grounds

Stadiums

After its foundation following the merging of Olympique Lillois and SC Fives, Lille alternately played its home games at the stadiums of both clubs: Stade Henri-Jooris of Olympique Lillois and Stade Jules-Lemaire of SC Fives. However, in 1949, the club chose to keep the first as his home ground and to use the second as a training ground. Becoming more and more obsolete, Stade Jules-Lemaire will be destroyed ten years later, in 1959. Named after Henri Jooris, the iconic president of Olympique Lillois, the 15,000-seat stadium, located by the Deûle river, near the Citadel of Lille, was the home of Les Dogues until 1975 when Lille moved at Stade Grimonprez-Jooris.

Located inside the citadel park, not far from the former venue, the stadium's original capacity was 25,000 at the time it was opened, but this was reduced to around 17,000 by 2000 due to the evolution of safety standards. In 2000, the stadium was renovated and its capacity was increased to 21,000. However, it still failed to meet FIFA licensing regulations and plans to build a new stadium compliant with UEFA's standards were made in 2002, when the club was privatized.

In June 2003, the club's board agreed to a new proposal put forward by the city mayor to build a new 33,000-seat stadium on the site of the Stade Grimonprez-Jooris. Preliminary works which included dismantling of training grounds were undertaken, and the delivery was scheduled for 31 December 2004 but was postponed. Construction work was then planned to begin in early 2005, but the project faced opposition from preservationists who successfully prevented the project to obtain necessary permits as the site of the stadium was close to the 17th-century citadel.

In May 2004, the stadium closed its doors and the delays forced Lille to play its league matches at Stadium Nord Lille Métropole, a 18,000-seat stadium in Villeneuve-d'Ascq, and their 2005–06 UEFA Champions League games at Stade de France in the Paris region. After two years of court battles, local courts had declared issued building permits void in July and December 2005, which meant that Grimonprez-Jooris II would never come into existence. Grimonprez-Jooris was demolished in 2010, six years after Lille OSC's departure. The club stayed at Stadium Lille Métropole until the end of the 2011-12 Ligue 1 season. While LOSC was struggling with its venue problems, the administrative landscape of the Lille area changed. The new administration, now in charge of the whole area, decided to launch a new stadium project.

On 1 February 2008, Eiffage was selected during a general meeting to build a 50,000-seat capacity multi-purpose stadium with a retractable roof. The stadium has also a particularity: it can become a fully functional arena of 30,000 seats that can host basketball, tennis or handball games as well as concerts. Stade Pierre-Mauroy, known for sponsorship reasons as Decathlon Arena – Stade Pierre-Mauroy since 2022, was inaugurated on 17 August 2012. Originally named the Grand Stade Lille Métropole, the stadium was renamed in 2013 in honor of the former Mayor of Lille and former Prime Minister of France Pierre Mauroy. The stadium venue is located in Villeneuve-d'Ascq and has a seating capacity of 50,186 people, becoming France's fourth largest stadium.

The stadium hosted France national football team and France national rugby union team as well as some games of UEFA Euro 2016 and many Top 14 matches. It has been chosen to be one of the nine venues selected for France's hosting of the 2023 Rugby World Cup. The 30,000-seat arena hosted EuroBasket 2015, Davis Cup, 2017 World Men's Handball Championship and will host handball and basketball tournaments at the 2024 Olympic Games.

The record attendance for a sports game stands at 49,712 spectators, who witnessed Lille's 5–1 win over Paris Saint-Germain in 2019.

Training facilities

Located in Camphin-en-Pévèle, 15 minutes away from central Lille, the Domaine de Luchin has been the club's training ground since 2007. A 43-hectare estate, it houses nine full-size pitches (including one artificial turf pitch), one goalkeepers training field, the club headquarters, the academy facility, classrooms and bedrooms as well as a medical pole, a fitness centre, press areas and the famous Dogue de Bronze, a bronze statue of a mastiff which has been installed in 2011 and appeared in many pictures and videos of the club. A stadium of 1,000 spectators, including 500 seats, can host matches for the academy and women's teams.

A segment of the Berlin Wall, with a graffiti of Eden Hazard by French artist C215 painted on it, has been unveiled in 2016 and is on display inside the centre.

Club rivalries

The Derby du Nord (French for "The North Derby") is contested between Lille and RC Lens. The derby name refers only to their geographical location in France; both clubs and cities only being located in the northern part of France, within the Hauts-de-France region but not the same department. Being the fourth-largest city of the Pas-de-Calais department, Lens is located 30 kilometres south of regional prefecture and nerve centre Lille, Nord department main city. The name can also refer to matches involving Lille and Valenciennes as both clubs are located within Nord, however, the match historically refers to matches involving Lille and Lens. As a result, the Lille–Valenciennes match is sometimes referred to as Le Petit Derby du Nord (French for "The Little North Derby").

The two clubs first met in 1937 when Lille were playing under the Olympique Lillois emblem. Due to each club's close proximity towards each other being separated by only  and sociological differences between each club's supporters, a fierce rivalry developed. The North Derby is underpinned by social and economic differences, since the city of Lens is known as an old, working-class, industrial city and Lille as a middle-class, modern, internationally oriented one. This social class opposition is no longer relevant: both fanbases now come from lower and middle classes.

As of 2022, the teams have played more than 115 matches in all competitions, Lille winning 45, Lens 37, and the remaining 34 having been drawn. Lille have won the most top division titles, the most Coupe de France trophies and Trophée des Champions titles. The Mastiffs have also played more games in domestic and European top competitions and have more game wins in French top division than their nearby rivals.

Honours

Domestic

League
French Division 1/Ligue 1
Winners (4): 1945–46, 1953–54, 2010–11, 2020–21
Runners-up (6): 1947–48, 1948–49, 1949–50, 1950–51, 2004–05, 2018–19
French Division 2
Winners (4): 1963–64, 1973–74, 1977–78, 1999–2000

Cups
Coupe de France
Winners (6): 1945–46, 1946–47, 1947–48, 1952–53, 1954–55, 2010–11
Runners-up (2): 1944–45, 1948–49
Coupe de la Ligue
Runners-up (1): 2015–16
Trophée des Champions
Winners (1): 2021
Runners-up (2): 1955, 2011
Coupe Charles Drago
Runners-up (2): 1954, 1956

Europe
UEFA Intertoto Cup
Winners (1): 2004
Runners-up (1): 2002
Latin Cup
Runners-up (1): 1951

Doubles
 French Division 1/Ligue 1 and Coupe de France (2): 1945–46, 2010–11

Results

Domestic results

Continental results

Players

First-team squad

Out on loan

Reserve team

Notable former players
Goalkeepers

 Robert Germain (1946–49)
 César Ruminski (1952–55)
 Jean Van Gool (1954–68)
 Charles Samoy (1963–74)
 Philippe Bergeroo (1978–83)
 Bernard Lama (1981–89)
 Jean-Claude Nadon (1989–96)
 Grégory Wimbée (1998–2004)
 Tony Sylva (2004–08)
 Mickaël Landreau (2009–12)
 Vincent Enyeama (2011–18)
 Mike Maignan (2015–21)

Defenders

 Joseph Jadrejak (1944–50)
 Jean-Marie Prévost (1945–52)
 Marceau Somerlinck (1945–57)
 Jacques Van Cappelen (1949–55)
 Cor van der Hart (1950–54)
 Guillaume Bieganski (1953–56)
 Robert Lemaître (1951–59)
 Antoine Pazur (1952–60)
 Bernard Stakowiak (1958–69)
 Claude Andrien (1962–69)
 Marcel Adamczyk (1963–68)
 Jean-Luc Buisine (1962–69)
 Ignacio Prieto (1971–76)
 Pierre Dréossi (1976–82)
 René Marsiglia (1978–83)
 Éric Péan (1981–87)
 Noureddine Kourichi (1982–86)
 Boro Primorac (1983–86)
 Éric Prissette (1983–90)
 Dominique Thomas (1983–88, 89–93)
 Jocelyn Angloma (1987–90)
 Jakob Friis-Hansen (1989–95)
 Fabien Leclercq (1989–99)
 Pascal Cygan (1995–2002)
 Grégory Tafforeau (2001–09)
 Eric Abidal (2002–04)
 Matthieu Chalmé (2002–07)
 Mathieu Debuchy (2003–13)
 Nicolas Plestan (2003–10)
 Stathis Tavlaridis (2004–07)
 Stephan Lichtsteiner (2005–08)
 Emerson (2006–11)
 Adil Rami (2006–11)
 Franck Béria (2007–17)
 Aurélien Chedjou (2007–13)
 David Rozehnal (2010–15)
 Pape Souaré (2010–15)
 Marko Baša (2011–17)
 Lucas Digne (2011–13)
 Djibril Sidibé (2012–16)
 Simon Kjær (2013–15)
 Adama Soumaoro (2013–21)
 Sébastien Corchia (2014–17)
 Benjamin Pavard (2015–16)
 Gabriel (2017–20)
 Zeki Çelik (2018–22)
 Reinildo Mandava (2018–22)
 Sven Botman (2020–22)

Midfielders

 Jules Bigot (1944–50)
 François Bourbotte (1944–47)
 Roger Carré (1944–50)
 Albert Dubreucq (1945–53)
 Roland Clauws (1953–60, 62–64)
 Alain de Martigny (1970–76)
 Alain Verhoeve (1970–74)
 Alberto Fouillioux (1972–75)
 Serge Besnard (1975–79)
 Alain Grumelon (1976–83)
 Arnaud Dos Santos (1977–81)
 Stéphane Plancque (1977–87)
 Didier Simon (1977–82)
 Pascal Plancque (1980–87)
 Philippe Périlleux (1984–91, 95–96)
 Alain Fiard (1987–93)
 Victor Da Silva (1988–92)
 Arnaud Duncker (1994–98)
 Patrick Collot (1995–2002)
 Christophe Landrin (1996–2005)
 Bruno Cheyrou (1998–2002)
 Benoît Cheyrou (1999–2004)
 Fernando D'Amico (1999–2003)
 Sylvain N'Diaye (2000–03)
 Jean Makoun (2001–08)
 Philippe Brunel (2002–05)
 Mathieu Bodmer (2003–07)
 Stéphane Dumont (2003–11)
 Milenko Ačimovič (2004–06)
 Yohan Cabaye (2004–11)
 Florent Balmont (2008–16)
 Rio Mavuba (2008–17)
 Idrissa Gueye (2010–15)
 Joe Cole (2011–12)
 Dimitri Payet (2011–13)
 Benoît Pedretti (2011–13)
 Rony Lopes (2014–15, 16–17)
 Yves Bissouma (2016–18)
 Thiago Mendes (2017–19)
 Boubakary Soumaré (2017–21)
 Xeka (2017–22)
 Renato Sanches (2019–22)
 Amadou Onana (2021–22)

Forwards

 Jean Baratte (1944–53, 56–57)
 René Bihel (1944–46)
 Jean Lechantre (1944–52)
 Roger Vandooren (1944–50)
 Bolek Tempowski (1945–51)
 Marius Walter (1945–52)
 André Strappe (1948–58)
 Bernard Lefèvre (1949–56, 62–63)
 Erik Kuld Jensen (1950–53)
 Jean Vincent (1950–56)
 Gérard Bourbotte (1952–58, 63–68)
 Yvon Douis (1953–59)
 Fernand Devlaminck (1956–59)
 François Heutte (1957–59, 65–66)
 René Fatoux (1957–62)
 André Guy (1965–67)
 Christian Coste (1973–77)
 Stanislav Karasi (1974–77)
 Žarko Olarević (1977–81)
 Pierre Pleimelding (1977–81)
 Dušan Savić (1983–85)
 Erwin Vandenbergh (1986–90)
 Abedi Pele (1988–90)
 Per Frandsen (1990–94)
 Éric Assadourian (1990–95)
 Antoine Sibierski (1992–96)
 Kennet Andersson (1993–94)
 Djézon Boutoille (1993–2004)
 Matt Moussilou (2001–06)
 Nicolas Fauvergue (2003–11)
 Kevin Mirallas (2004–08)
 Peter Odemwingie (2004–07)
 Kader Keïta (2005–07)
 Michel Bastos (2006–09)
 Eden Hazard (2007–12)
 Patrick Kluivert (2007–08)
 Ludovic Obraniak (2007–12)
 Túlio de Melo (2008–14)
 Pierre-Alain Frau (2008–11)
 Pierre-Emerick Aubameyang (2009–10)
 Gervinho (2009–11)
 Moussa Sow (2010–12)
 Salomon Kalou (2012–14)
 Divock Origi (2012–15)
 Nolan Roux (2012–15)
 Sofiane Boufal (2015–16)
 Eder (2016–18)
 Martin Terrier (2016–18)
 Luiz Araújo (2017–21)
 Lebo Mothiba (2017–18)
 Nicolas Pépé (2017–19)
 Jonathan Ikoné (2018–22)
 Rafael Leão (2018–19)
 Loïc Rémy (2018–20)
 Victor Osimhen (2019–20)
 Burak Yılmaz (2020–22)

Notable past line-ups

Club officials
 Owner of Lille Olympique Sporting Club – LOSC Lille:  Merlyn Partners SCSp

Board of directors

Coaching and medical staff

Coaching history
Former coaches include Georges Heylens (1984–89), a former Belgian international player, Jacques Santini (1989–92), who coached the France national team between 2002 and 2004, Bruno Metsu (1992–93), who coached the Senegal national team at the 2002 World Cup, Pierre Mankowski (1993–94), who was formerly the assistant coach of the France national team and Vahid Halilhodžić (1998–02), who can be credited with the club's revival in the late nineties. Rudi Garcia, who played for Lille from 1980 to 1988, replaced Claude Puel at the beginning of the 2008 season. Puel had been with Lille since 2002. Thanks to his successes with the club, Puel had been approached by Portuguese club Porto to replace José Mourinho and league rivals Lyon to replace Alain Perrin; he finally decided to join Lyon after six seasons at the club. Christophe Galtier (2017–21) won Ligue 1 in 2021 and was replaced by Jocelyn Gourvennec (2021–22) who won the 2021 Trophée des Champions.

Records and statistics

Managerial records

Winning head coaches

Players records

Most appearances

Top scorers

Transfers records

Highest transfer fees paid

Notes

Highest transfer fees received

Notes

See also
 Lille OSC in European football
 List of football clubs in France
 Football records and statistics in France

References

External links
 
 Lille Olympique Sporting Club – Ligue 1
 Lille Olympique Sporting Club – UEFA.com

 
Sport in Lille
Villeneuve-d'Ascq
Association football clubs established in 1944
1944 establishments in France
UEFA Intertoto Cup winning clubs
Football clubs in France
Football clubs in Hauts-de-France